The modern pentathlon at the 1984 Summer Olympics was represented by two events: Individual competition and Team competition. As usual in Olympic modern pentathlon, one competition was held and each competitor's score was included to the Individual competition event results table and was also added to his teammates' scores to be included to the Team competition event results table. This competition consisted of 5 disciplines:

Equestrian, held on July 29.
Fencing, held on July 30.
Swimming, held on July 31.
Shooting, held on August 1.
Cross-country, also held on August 1.

The four out of the five events took place at the Coto Equestrian Center in Coto de Caza, California, while the swimming portion was held at the William Woollett Jr. Aquatics Center in nearby Irvine, California.

Participating nations
A total of 52 athletes from 18 nations competed at the Los Angeles Games:

Medal summary

Medal table

See also
 Modern pentathlon at the Friendship Games

References

External links
Official Olympic Report

 
1984 Summer Olympics events